Except for my mother is a 1991 Egyptian comedy film directed by Elham Shaheen, Mohsen Mohieldin, Samira Mohsen, Waheed Seif, Naima Al-Saghir and directed by Abdul Aleem.

Plot 

A strong, fit, dancer and intelligent person who loves his classmate in college. The two parties set a date to confirm the engagement. As for Mohsen, he faces an accident and becomes paralyzed. between his lover.

Cast 

 Elham Shaheen as Basma
 Mohsen Mohieldin as Mohsen
 Samira Mohsen as Nadia
 Waheed Saif uncle Basma 
 Naima Al-Soghair as Fathia 
 Hanan Shawky as Laila
 Tawfik El Deken as El Baz Afandi.

See also 

 Cinema of Egypt
 Lists of Egyptian films
 List of Egyptian films of the 1991s
 List of Egyptian films of 1991.

References

External links 

 Except my mother in Egyptian cinema.